XHUL-FM is a radio station on 96.9 FM in Mérida, Yucatán, Mexico. It is owned by Cadena RASA and carries the news/talk programming of El Heraldo Radio, owned by El Heraldo de México newspaper.

History
XEUL-AM 1360 received its concession on August 31, 1971. It broadcast with 500 watts from Progreso, Yucatán, and was owned by Ester Ávila Alonso. It moved to 930 in Mérida, with 2.5 kW day, in the 1990s and was sold to Radio Progreso de Yucatán in 1997.

It migrated to FM after being authorized to move in 2010. Its call sign was changed to XHUL-FM.

On January 1, 2023, Cadena RASA moved the Los 40 format and on-air staff from XHUL-FM 96.9 to XHPYM-FM, displacing that station's existing "Retro FM" classic hits format, and leased XHUL-FM to El Heraldo Radio.

References

Radio stations in Yucatán
Radio stations established in 1971
1971 establishments in Mexico